The Asia/Oceania Zone is one of the three zones of regional Davis Cup competition in 2013.

In the Asia/Oceania Zone there are four different groups in which teams compete against each other to advance to the next group.

Teams

Format
The eight teams will be split into two pools of four, the top two nations will advance to the promotion pool. The two best teams from there will be promoted to Group II for 2014. The bottom two teams will play in a relegation pool, where the two last teams will be relegated to Group IV for 2014.

It was played on the week commencing 9 September 2013 and it was played at the Aviation Tennis Club in Dubai, United Arab Emirates.

Pools

Play-offs

  and  promoted to Group II in 2014
  and  relegated to Group IV in 2014

First round

Pool A

Hong Kong vs. Oman

Malaysia vs. Iran

Hong Kong vs. Malaysia

Oman vs. Iran

Hong Kong vs. Iran

Malaysia vs. Oman

Pool B

Vietnam vs. Cambodia

Pacific Oceania vs. United Arab Emirates

Pacific Oceania vs. Vietnam

United Arab Emirates vs. Cambodia

Pacific Oceania vs. Cambodia

Vietnam vs. United Arab Emirates

Second round

Promotion pool

Cambodia vs. Hong Kong

Vietnam vs. Malaysia

Cambodia vs. Malaysia

Vietnam vs. Hong Kong

Relegation pool

Iran vs. Pacific Oceania

Oman vs. United Arab Emirates

Iran vs. United Arab Emirates

Oman vs. Pacific Oceania

References

External links

Asia Oceania Zone III
Davis Cup Asia/Oceania Zone